Ecologically or ecological unequal exchange is a concept from ecological economics that builds from the notion of unequal exchange. It considers the inequities hidden in the monetary value of trade flows not only in terms of wages, and quantities of labor but also regarding materials, energy and environmental degradation. As labor is also a form of energy, unequal exchange of embodied labor can even be considered a subset of the wider phenomenon of ecologically unequal exchange. There is an uneven utilization of the environment at the global level not only due to the uneven distribution of resources, but also to shift the environmental burden. The consumption and capital accumulation of core countries are based on environmental degradation and extraction in periphery countries. Sustainability analysis and solutions with a production-based perspective in core countries may thus keep increase unsustainability at the global level. The current configuration of global production networks that leads to this asymmetric trade patterns has evolved historically with colonialism. Whereas ecological unequal exchange is a concept developed in academia, the concept of ecological debt is used in an activism context of environmental justice. The latter defines the accumulation of this unequal exchange through history

References 

Ecological economics
Imperialism studies